The Tanglapui languages are a pair of closely related Papuan languages, Sawila and Kula, spoken on the island of Alor, which lies north of Timor in south east Indonesia. They have only marginal mutual intelligibility, and are ethnically distinct; nonetheless, the name 'Tanglapui' is used for either language.

References

 
Alor–Pantar languages
Languages of Indonesia